Rakek is a settlement in the Municipality of Cerknica in the Inner Carniola region of Slovenia.

Name
Rakek was attested in written sources in 1300 as Rachach and in 1498 as Rakeckh. The name is derived from the Rak River. The Italian name Recchio was coined in the 20th century.

History

In 1857 the Austrian Southern Railway line was built through the settlement and it became an important collection point for timber from surrounding forests.
There is a monument to victims of World War II by the Slovene sculptor Jakob Savinšek in the main square in front of the railway station.

Church

The parish church in the settlement is dedicated to the Sacred Heart of Jesus and belongs to the Roman Catholic Archdiocese of Ljubljana. It was built in the late 16th century and was extensively rebuilt and extended between 1935 and 1938, based partly on plans by Jože Plečnik.

References

External links

Rakek on Geopedia

Populated places in the Municipality of Cerknica